Jonny is a two-person band formed by Norman Blake of Teenage Fanclub and Euros Childs of Gorky's Zygotic Mynci.  The two bands toured together in 1997 and Blake contributed to the  Gorky's Zygotic Mynci album How I Long to Feel That Summer in My Heart (2001).

Jonny released an EP in 2006 and their debut album on Merge Records in 2011, the latter of which was recorded with Teenage Fanclub bassist Dave McGowan and BMX Bandits drummer Stuart Kidd.

The band's second album is expected to be recorded in 2015.

Discography
 Jonny (2011)

References

External links
 Merge Records page

Merge Records artists
British indie rock groups
Rock music duos